is a Osamu Suzuki's Novel. And 2008 Japanese film directed by Tsutomu Hanabusa. The film showed at the 2009 11th Udine Far East Film International Premiere.

Plot  
An overweight restaurant owner Takuro (Muga Tsukaji) while popular with people for his delicious dinners, is unlucky in love because of his looks, dress sense and terrible habits. Takuro longs for his part-time waitress Hiroko who fell for him
because of his warm-hearted nature, but rejects him because she believes he only cares about her looks.

A distraught Takuro is given the opportunity to try out a new invention, the Handsome Suit, which will make him good-looking, tall and deep-voiced. He puts it on and transforms himself into "Annin Hikariyama" and quickly becomes a supermodel.
He meets "Raika", who a gorgeous, beautiful and prestigious model. She becomes attracted to him as she works and aggressively seduces him. He delights in it, indulges in kissing Laika, and almost falls in love with her.

Noticing how differently he’s treated, Takuro has to learn to overcome how looks matter both to himself and to society in general, particularly when he meets the homely but sweet Motoe.
He is faced with a choice.

Cast 
Muga Tsukaji as Takuro Ohki 
Shosuke Tanihara as Kyonin Mitsuyama 
Keiko Kitagawa as Hiroko Hoshino
Miyuki Oshima as Hone Hashino 
Hiroyuki Ikeuchi as Shinsuke Hazama
Kiyoshi Nakajo as Shiraki
Mayumi Sada as Raika.

References 

2008 films
2000s Japanese-language films
Films directed by Tsutomu Hanabusa
2000s Japanese films